Tiyasha Roy (born 16 August 1999) is a Bengali Indian television actress. She is known for portraying the character of Shyama in the Bengali television series Krishnakoli.

Career 

Tiyasha started her career in television as a lead actress. In 2018, she started acting  in Bengali television series Krishnakoli. The series is aired on Zee Bangla and as of October 2021, it completed more than 1100 episodes. She was married to Bengali TV actor, Suban Roy.

TV shows 
Regular shows
 Bangla Medium (Star Jalsha) (2022–present)
 Rannaghor as host (Zee Bangla)
 Krishnakoli as Shyama Chowdhury.(Zee Bangla) (2018-2022)

Mahalaya

 Shaktirupeno as Debi Rankini Kali. (Zee Bangla Mahalaya) (2018)
 12 Maashe 12 Rupe Debiboron as Debi Sankatnashini. (Zee Bangla Mahalaya) (2019)
 Durga Soptosoti Sambhavami Yuge Yuge as Debi Roktodontika. (Zee Bangla Mahalaya) (2020)
 Nanarupe Mahamaya as Debi Kaushiki. (Zee Bangla Mahalaya) (2021)
 Ya Chandi as Debi Kaushiki. (Star Jalsha Mahalaya) (2022)

Guest Appearance
 
 Dadagiri as Herself. (Zee Bangla)
 Didi No 1 as Herself.(Zee Bangla)

Awards

References 

Bengali actresses
21st-century Indian actresses
Living people
1999 births